The Washington Mill Bridge is a road bridge crossing Lytle Creek near Bernard, Iowa that was built in 1877–78.  It is a bowstring, through arch bridge, manufactured and built by the Massillon Bridge Company.

The bridge is significant for its engineering. As of 1994, the bridge's setting was relatively unchanged since the bridge's construction more than 100 years before.

It was listed on the National Register of Historic Places in 1998.

References

Bridges completed in 1877
Arch bridges in Iowa
National Register of Historic Places in Dubuque County, Iowa
Road bridges on the National Register of Historic Places in Iowa
Bridges in Dubuque County, Iowa
Through arch bridges in the United States
Tied arch bridges in the United States
1877 establishments in Iowa